Ruth Thomas (4 January 1927 – 25 August 2011) was an English author of children's fiction. For her first novel, The Runaways, she won the 1988 Guardian Children's Fiction Prize, an annual book award judged by a panel of British children's writers.

Thomas was born in Wellington, Somerset, England, to two primary school teachers.

Her books draw on her own experiences as a primary school teacher, at first in East London; during the 1980s in Kensal Green, north west London.
Books include The Runaways (1987), The Class that Went Wild (1988), The New Boy (1989), The Secret (1990), Guilty (1993), The Paper Bag Baby (1993) and Hideaway (1994).

References

External links
 Ruth Thomas At RandomHouse

English children's writers
Schoolteachers from Somerset
Guardian Children's Fiction Prize winners
Alumni of the University of Bristol
1927 births
2011 deaths
Place of death missing